Walter Schartner (3 December 1894 – 24 May 1970) was a German conductor, composer and Hochschullehrer. In 1949/50, he was chief conductor of the Philharmonisches Staatsorchester Halle.

Life 
Schartner was born in Berlin in 1894. There he attended the Stern Conservatory where Leo Blech was his main teacher. A first Kapellmeister position in Königsberg was followed by posts in Münster and Bremerhaven. In 1926, he conducted the Hans Rudolf Waldburg production of Handel's opera Rodelinda in Bremerhaven. From 1928 to 1944, he worked in Görlitz.

In 1945, Schartner was appointed director of the Hochschule für Musik Carl Maria von Weber Dresden. Guest conducting led him among others at the Semperoper and the Dresden Philharmonic. After a guest performance in Halle in 1946, he received his appointment as Municipal Music Director by the Lord Mayor of Halle,  at the suggestion of the Theatre Committee. In June 1946, he conducted his first symphony concert in Halle. Following a proposal by Pretzsch, the president of the province of Saxony, Erhard Hübener, appointed him Generalmusikdirektor in September 1946. In 1948, he conducted the premiere of Handels Xerses at the Thalia Theater; the production was directed by Sigurd Baller. In Halle, he also made a name for himself as a composer, and in 1948 his opera Und Pippa tanzt based on  eponymous play by Gerhart Hauptmann was premiered at the Landestheater. In April 1949, the Minister for National Education, Arts and Science, declared that his contract as general music director would not be renewed. Nevertheless, he was appointed artistic director of the Philharmonic State Orchestra Halle in 1949/50.

In 1950, Schartner received a proposition from the Hochschule für Musik Carl Maria von Weber. In 1950/51, he was conductor of the {Loh-Orchester Sondershausen. After that, he was conductor of the Berliner Rundfunk. In 1951, together with the Berlin Radio Choir and the Berlin Radio Symphony Orchestra he presented the complete opera recording of  ' Lortzing's Regina. Later he was 1st Kapellmeister and Musical Director of the Volkspark Rehberge in West Berlin.

Until his death, Schartner was married with the composer, pianist, lyricist and chanson interpreter Jeanette Chéro (born 1927, née Roscher, civil name Christiane Schartner).

Further reading 
 Susanne Baselt: Chronik des Philharmonischen Staatsorchesters Halle. Part I: 1946 bis 1964. Edited by the management of the Philharmonic State Orchestra Halle, 1999, pp. 38ff.
 , Hans Joachim Moser (ed.): Kürschners biographisches Theater-Handbuch. Schauspiel, Oper, Film, Rundfunk. Deutschland, Österreich, Schweiz. de Gruyter, Berlin 1956, .

References

External links 
 
 

1894 births
1970 deaths
20th-century classical composers
German conductors (music)
German opera composers
Male opera composers
Musicians from Berlin
20th-century German male musicians